Mizrahi Jews, also known as Mizrahim or Mizrachi and alternatively referred to as Oriental Jews or Edot HaMizrach, are a grouping of Jewish communities comprising those who remained in the Land of Israel and those who existed in diaspora throughout and around the Middle East and North Africa (MENA) from biblical times into the modern era.

Mizrahi is a political sociological term that was coined with the creation of the State of Israel. It translates as “Easterner” in Hebrew and refers to Oriental Jews. In current usage, the term Mizrahi is almost exclusively applied to descendants of Jewish communities from the Middle East and North Africa; in this classification are the descendants of Mashriqi Jews who had lived in Middle Eastern countries, such as Egyptian Jews, Iranian Jews, Iraqi Jews, Kurdish Jews, Lebanese Jews, Syrian Jews, Turkish Jews, and Yemenite Jews; as well as the descendants of Maghrebi Jews who had lived in North African countries, such as Algerian Jews, Libyan Jews, Moroccan Jews, and Tunisian Jews. These various Jewish communities were first officially grouped into a singular identifiable division during World War II, when they were distinctly outlined in the One Million Plan of the Jewish Agency for Israel, which detailed the methods by which Jews in diaspora were to be returned to the Land of Israel (then under the British Mandate of Palestine) after the Holocaust.

Mizrahi is also sometimes extended to include Jewish communities from Central Asia and the Caucasus such as the Bukharan Jews from Uzbekistan and Tajikistan, and the Mountain Jews from Dagestan and Azerbaijan. While these communities have traditionally spoken Judaeo-Iranian languages such as Juhuri and Bukharian, their descendants are also widely fluent in Russian due to those countries' existence as republics of the former Soviet Union.

Before the declaration of independence of the State of Israel in 1948, the various now-Mizrahi Jewish communities did not identify themselves as a distinctive Jewish subgroup, and instead characterized themselves as Sephardi Jews as they largely followed the Sephardic customs and traditions of Judaism (with some differences in minhagim between particular communities). The original Sephardi Jewish community was formed by the Jewish diaspora population in the Iberian Peninsula (Spain and Portugal), from where they were exiled in the 15th century; the exodus from Spain led many Sephardim to settle in areas where Mizrahi communities already existed. These phenomena have resulted in a conflation of terms, particularly in official Israeli ethnic and religious terminology, with Sephardi being used in a broad sense and including Middle Eastern Jews, North African Jews, as well as Sephardim proper from Southern Europe around the Mediterranean Basin. Per a decree by the authority of the Chief Rabbinate of Israel, any rabbis of Mizrahi origin in Israel are under the jurisdiction of the order of Sephardi chief rabbis.

Following the First Arab–Israeli War, over 850,000 Mizrahi and Sephardi Jews were expelled or evacuated from Arab and Muslim-majority countries from 1948 until the early 1980s. , 61 percent of Israeli Jews were of full or partial Mizrahi/Sephardi ancestry.

Terminology
"Mizrahi" is literally translated as "Oriental", "Eastern",  Mizraḥ, Hebrew for "east". In the past, the word "Mizrahim", corresponding to the Arabic word Mashriqiyyun (Arabic "مشريقيون" or Easterners), referred to the natives of Iraq and other Asian countries, as distinct from those of North Africa (Maghribiyyun). In medieval and early modern times, the corresponding Hebrew word ma'arav was used for North Africa. In Talmudic and Geonic times, however, this word "ma'arav" referred to the land of Israel, as contrasted with Babylonia. For this reason, many object to the use of "Mizrahi" to include Moroccan and other North African Jews.

In the past, the origin of the term Mizrahi was in the Hebrew translation of Eastern European Jews' German name Ostjuden, as seen in the Mizrahi Movement, Bank Mizrahi and in HaPoel HaMizrahi. During the 1940s, before Israel's establishment, the demographer Roberto Bachi used the categories of "Mizrahim" and "Ashkenzim" in his ethnic classification of the Yishuv. In the 1950s, the Jews who came from the communities listed above were simply called and known as Jews (Yahud in Arabic) and to distinguish them in the Jewish sub-ethnicities, Israeli officials, who themselves were mostly Eastern European Jews, transferred the name to them, though most of these immigrants arrived from lands located further westward than Central Europe. Mizrahi is subsequently among the surnames most often changed by Israelis, and many scholars, including Avshalom Kor, claim that the transferring of the name "Mizrahim" was a form of Orientalism towards the Oriental Jews, similar to the ways in which Westjuden had labeled Ostjuden as "second class" and excluded them from possible positions of power.

The usage of the term Mizrahim or Edot Hamizraḥ, Oriental communities, grew in Israel under the circumstances of the meeting of waves of Jewish immigrants from Europe, North Africa, the Middle East and Central Asia, followers of Ashkenazi, Sephardi, and Temani (Yemenite) rites. In modern Israeli usage, it refers to all Jews from Central and West Asian countries, many of them Arabic-speaking Muslim-majority countries. The term came to be widely used more by Mizrahi activists in the early 1990s. Since then in Israel it has become an accepted semi-official and media designation.

Before the establishment of the state of Israel, Mizrahi Jews did not identify themselves as a separate Jewish subgroup. Instead, Mizrahi Jews generally characterized themselves as Sephardi, as they follow the customs and traditions of Sephardi Judaism (but with some differences among the minhag "customs" of particular communities). That has resulted in a conflation of terms, particularly in Israel and in religious usage, with "Sephardi" being used in a broad sense and including Mizrahi Jews, North African Jews as well as Sephardim proper. From the point of view of the official Israeli rabbinate, any rabbis of Mizrahi origin in Israel are under the jurisdiction of the Sephardi Chief Rabbi of Israel.

Sami Michael rejects the terms "Mizrahim" and "Edot HaMizrach", claiming it is a fictitious identity advanced by Mapai to preserve a "rival" to the "Ashkenazim" and help them push the "Mizrahim" below in the social-economic ladder and behind them, so they won't ever be in line with the Israeli elites of European Jewish descent. He's also going against the Mapai manner of labeling all the Oriental Jews as "one folk" and erasing their unique and individual history as separated communities; he wonders why the real Easterners of his time who were the Eastern European Jewish peasants from the villages weren't labeled as "Mizrahi" in Israel while fitting it more than the Oriental Jews who were labeled that way. Michael is also against the inclusion of Oriental Jewish communities who do not descend from Sepharadic Jews, as his own Iraqi Jews, as "Sepharadim" by the Israeli politicians, calling it "historically inaccurate". He also mentions that his work as an author is always referred to as "Ethnic" while European Jews' work, even if historic in theme, isn't for that very racism.

Most of the "Mizrahi" activists actually originated from North African Jewish communities, traditionally called "Westerners" (Maghrebi), rather than "Easterners" (Mashreqi). The Jews who made Aliya from North Africa in the 19th Century and prior started their own political and religious organization in 1860 which operated in Jerusalem was called "The Western Jewish Diaspora Council" (Hebrew: "ועד העדה המערבית בירושלים"). Many Jews originated from Arab and Muslim countries today reject "Mizrahi" (or any) umbrella description, and prefer to identify themselves by their particular country of origin, or that of their immediate ancestors, e. g., "Moroccan Jew", or prefer to use the old term "Sephardi" in its broader meaning.

Religious rite designations
Today, many identify non-Ashkenazi rite Jews as Sephardi – in modern Hebrew Sfaradim – mixing ancestral origin and religious rite. This broader definition of "Sephardim" as including all, or most, Mizrahi Jews is also common in Jewish religious circles. During the past century, the Sephardi rite absorbed part of the unique rite of the Yemenite Jews, and lately, Beta Israel religious leaders in Israel have also joined Sefardi rite collectivities, especially following rejection of their Jewishness by some Ashkenazi circles.

The reason for this classification of all Mizrahim under Sephardi rite is that most Mizrahi communities use much the same religious rituals as Sephardim proper due to historical reasons. The prevalence of the Sephardi rite among Mizrahim is partially a result of Sephardim proper joining some of Mizrahi communities following the 1492 Alhambra Decree, which expelled Jews from Sepharad (Spain and Portugal). Over the last few centuries, the previously distinctive rites of the Mizrahi communities were influenced, superimposed upon or altogether replaced by the rite of the Sephardim, perceived as more prestigious. Even before this assimilation, the original rite of many Jewish Oriental communities was already closer to the Sephardi rite than to the Ashkenazi one. For this reason, "Sephardim" has come to mean not only "Spanish Jews" proper but "Jews of the Spanish rite", just as "Ashkenazim" is used for "Jews of the German rite", whether or not their families originate in Germany.

Many of the Sephardi Jews exiled from Spain resettled in greater or lesser numbers in the Arab world, such as Syria and Morocco. In Syria, most eventually intermarried with, and assimilated into, the larger established communities of Musta'rabim and Mizrahim. In some North African countries, such as Morocco, Sephardi Jews came in greater numbers, and so largely contributed to the Jewish settlements that the pre-existing Jews were assimilated by the more recently arrived Sephardi Jews. Either way, this assimilation, combined with the use of the Sephardi rite, led to the popular designation and conflation of most non-Ashkenazi Jewish communities from Western Asia and North Africa as "Sephardi rite", whether or not they were descended from Spanish Jews, which is what the terms "Sephardi Jews" and "Sfaradim" properly implied when used in the ethnic as opposed to the religious sense.

In some Arabic countries, such as Egypt and Syria, Sephardi Jews arrived via the Ottoman Empire would distinguish themselves from the already established Musta'rabim, while in others, such as Morocco and Algeria, the two communities largely intermarried, with the latter embracing Sephardi customs and thus forming a single community.

Language

Arabic

In the Arab world (such as Morocco, Algeria, Tunisia, Libya, Egypt, Yemen, Jordan, Lebanon, Iraq, and Syria), Mizrahim most often speak Arabic, although Arabic is now mainly used as a second language, especially by the older generation. Most of the many notable philosophical, religious and literary works of the Jews in Spain, North Africa and Asia were written in Arabic using a modified Hebrew alphabet.

Aramaic

Aramaic is a Semitic language subfamily. Specific varieties of Aramaic are identified as "Jewish languages" since they are the languages of major Jewish texts such as the Talmud and Zohar, and many ritual recitations such as the Kaddish. Traditionally, Aramaic has been a language of Talmudic debate in yeshivot, as many rabbinic texts are written in a mixture of Hebrew and Aramaic. The current Hebrew alphabet, known as "Assyrian lettering" or "the square script", was in fact borrowed from Aramaic.

In Kurdistan, a region which includes parts of Turkey, Syria, Iraq and Iran, the language of the Mizrahim is a variant of Aramaic. As spoken by the Kurdish Jews, Judeo-Aramaic languages are Neo-Aramaic languages descended from Jewish Babylonian Aramaic. They are related to the Christian Aramaic dialects spoken by Assyrian people, which are Syriac Christians who claim descent from Assyria, one of the oldest civilizations in the world, dating back to 2500 BC in ancient Mesopotamia.

Persian and other languages
Among other languages associated with Mizrahim are Judeo-Iranian languages such as Judeo-Persian, the Bukhori dialect, Judeo-Tat, and Kurdish languages; Georgian; Judeo-Marathi and Judeo-Malayalam. Most Persian Jews speak standard Persian, as do many other Jews from Iran, Afghanistan, and Bukhara (Uzbekistan), Judeo-Tat, a form of Persian, is spoken by the Mountain Jews of Azerbaijan and Russian Dagestan, and in other Caucasian territories in Russia.

History 
The Jewish diaspora in the Middle East outside the Land of Israel started in the 6th century BCE, during the Babylonian captivity, which also caused some Jews to flee to Egypt. Other early diaspora areas in the Middle East and North Africa were Persia, Yemen and Cyrene.

As Islam started to spread in the 7th century CE, Jews who were living under Muslim rule became dhimmis. Because Jews were seen as "People of the Book", they were allowed to practice their own religion, but they had an inferior status in an Islamic society. Even though Jews in the Middle East and North Africa formed strong attachments to the areas in which they lived, they were seen as a community which was clearly distinct from other communities. For example, while Musta'arabi Jews in the Arab world were influenced by the local culture, e.g. they started speaking variants of the Arabic language and ate their own versions of the same food, they did not adopt Arab identity. Instead, Jews in the Arab world saw themselves (including the ones with family background of converts) and were seen as fundamentally a part of the wider collective of the Jewish people, and they maintained their identity as the descendants of the ancient Israelite tribes.

Some Mizrahim migrated to India, Central Asia, and China.

Post-1948 dispersal

After the establishment of the State of Israel and subsequent 1948 Arab–Israeli War, most Mizrahim were either expelled by their Arab rulers or chose to leave and emigrated to Israel. According to the 2009 Statistical Abstract of Israel, 50.2% of Israeli Jews are of Mizrahi or Sephardi origin.

Anti-Jewish actions by Arab governments in the 1950s and 1960s, in the context of the founding of the State of Israel, led to the departure of large numbers of Mizrahi Jews from the Middle East. The exodus of 25,000 Mizrahi Jews from Egypt after the 1956 Suez Crisis led to the overwhelming majority of Mizrahim leaving Arab countries. They became refugees. Most went to Israel. Many Moroccan and Algerian Jews went to France. Thousands of Lebanese, Syrian and Egyptian Jews emigrated to the United States and to Brazil.

Today, as many as 40,000 Mizrahim still remain in communities scattered throughout the non-Arab Muslim world, primarily in Iran, but also Uzbekistan, Azerbaijan, and Turkey. There are few Maghrebim remaining in the Arab world. About 3,000 remain in Morocco and 1,100 in Tunisia. Other countries with remnants of ancient Jewish communities with official recognition, such as Lebanon, have 100 or fewer Jews. A trickle of emigration continues, mainly to Israel and the United States.

Memorialization in Israel
9 May 2021, the first physical memorialization in Israel of the Departure and Expulsion of Jews from Arab land and Iran was placed on the Sherover Promenade in Jerusalem. It is titled the Departure and Expulsion Memorial following the Knesset law for the annual recognition of the Jewish experience held annually on 30 November.

The text on the Memorial reads;

"With the birth of the State of Israel, over 850,000
Jews were forced from Arab Lands and Iran.
The desperate refugees were welcomed by Israel.

By Act of the Knesset: 30 Nov, annually, is the
Departure and Expulsion Memorial Day.
Memorial donated by the Jewish American Society for Historic Preservation,
With support from the World Sephardi Federation, City of Jerusalem and the Jerusalem Foundation"

The sculpture is the interpretive work of Sam Philipe, a fifth generation Jerusalemite.

Absorption into Israeli society
Refuge in Israel was not without its tragedies: "In a generation or two, millennia of rooted Oriental civilization, unified even in its diversity", had been wiped out, writes Mizrahi scholar Ella Shohat. The trauma of rupture from their countries of origin was further complicated by the difficulty of the transition upon arrival in Israel; Mizrahi immigrants and refugees were placed in rudimentary and hastily erected tent cities (ma'abarot) often in development towns on the peripheries of Israel. Settlement in moshavim (cooperative farming villages) was only partially successful, because Mizrahim had historically filled a niche as craftsmen and merchants and most did not traditionally engage in farmwork. As the majority left their property behind in their home countries as they journeyed to Israel, many suffered a severe decrease in their socio-economic status aggravated by their cultural and political differences with the dominant Ashkenazi community. Furthermore, a policy of austerity was enforced at that time due to economic hardships.

Mizrahi immigrants arrived speaking many languages:
 many, especially those from North Africa and the fertile crescent, spoke Arabic dialects;
 those from Iran spoke Persian;
 Mountain Jews from Azerbaijan spoke Judeo-Tat;
 Baghdadi Jews from India spoke English;
 Bukharan Jews from Uzbekistan and Tajikistan spoke the Bukhori dialect;
the Malabar Jews from Kerala, India, arrived speaking Judeo-Malayalam.
 the Bene Israel from Maharashtra, India, arrived speaking Marathi.
Mizrahim from elsewhere brought Georgian, Judaeo-Georgian and various other languages with them. Hebrew had historically been a language only of prayer for most Jews not living in Israel, including the Mizrahim. Thus, with their arrival in Israel, the Mizrahim retained culture, customs and language distinct from their Ashkenazi counterparts. The collective estimate for Mizrahim (circa 2018) is at 4,000,000.

Disparities and integration

The cultural differences between Mizrahi and Ashkenazi Jews impacted the degree and rate of assimilation into Israeli society, and sometimes the divide between Eastern European and Middle Eastern Jews was quite sharp. Segregation, especially in the area of housing, limited integration possibilities over the years. Intermarriage between Ashkenazim and Mizrahim is increasingly common in Israel and by the late 1990s 28% of all Israeli children had multi-ethnic parents (up from 14% in the 1950s). It has been claimed that intermarriage does not tend to decrease ethnic differences in socio-economic status, however, that does not apply to the children of inter-ethnic marriages.

Although social integration is constantly improving, disparities persist. A study conducted by the Israeli Central Bureau of Statistics (ICBS), Mizrahi Jews are less likely to pursue academic studies than Ashkenazi Jews. Israeli-born Ashkenazim are up to twice more likely to study in a university than Israeli-born Mizrahim. Furthermore, the percentage of Mizrahim who seek a university education remains low compared to second-generation immigrant groups of Ashkenazi origin, such as Russians. According to a survey by the Adva Center, the average income of Ashkenazim was 36 percent higher than that of Mizrahim in 2004.

Genetics 

In 2000, M. Hammer, et al. conducted a study on 1,371 men and definitively established that part of the paternal gene pool of Jewish communities in Europe, North Africa and Middle East came from a common Middle East ancestral population. They suggested that most Jewish communities in the diaspora remained relatively isolated and endogamous compared to non-Jewish neighbor populations.

In a 2010 study by Behar, et al. the Iranian, Iraqi, Azerbaijani and Georgian Jewish communities formed a "tight cluster" overlying non-Jewish samples from the Levant with Ashkenazi, Moroccan, Bulgarian and Turkish Jews and Samaritans, results being "consistent with an historical formulation of the Jewish people as descending from ancient Hebrew and Israelite residents of the Levant". Yemenite Jews formed their own sub-cluster that was "also located within an assemblage of Levantine samples" but also showed notable relation "primarily with Bedouins but also with Saudi individuals".

See also

 Adeni Jews
 Arab Jews
 Arab–Israeli conflict
 Berber Jews
 Eastern Sephardim
 Genetic studies on Jews
 Hebrews
 History of the Jews under Muslim rule
 Islamic–Jewish relations
 Jewish culture
 Jewish ethnic divisions
 Jewish history
 List of Israeli Mizrahi and Sephardi Jews
 North African Sephardim
 Palestinian Jews
 Spanish and Portuguese Jews

References

Bibliography

External links

Organizations
 World Organization of Jews from Arab Countries
 Sephardic Pizmonim Project
 JIMENA – Jews Indigenous to the Middle East and North Africa
 Middle Eastern and North African Jews at the Multiculturalism Project
 Hakeshet Hademocratit Hamizrachit – an organization of Mizrahi Jews in Israel
 Harif: Association of Jews from the Middle East and North Africa (British-based)
 Ha' Yisrayli Torah Brith Yahad, Mizrahi Jewish Int'l Medical Humanitarian NGO recognized by the United Nations Civil Society and Economic Development Division (US-based)
Sephardi Voices UK – audiovisual testimonies of Jews in the UK originally from the Middle East, North Africa and Iran

Articles
 Ella Shohat, Israeli Cinema: East/West and the Politics of Representation, (Austin: University of Texas Press, 1989; New Edition, London: I. B. Tauris, 2010).
 Ella Shohat, Le sionisme du point de vue de ses victimes juives: les juifs orientaux en Israel (first published in 1988, with a new introduction, La fabrique editions, Paris, 2006).
 Ella Shohat, Taboo Memories, Diasporic Voices (Durham: Duke University Press, 2006).
 Ella Shohat, "Rupture and Return: Zionist Discourse and the Study of Arab Jews", Social Text, Vol. 21, No. 2 (Summer 2003), pp. 49–74
 Ella Shohat, "The Invention of the Mizrahim", Journal of Palestine Studies, Vol. 29, No. 1 (Autumn 1999), pp. 5–20
 Ella Shohat, "The Narrative of the Nation and the Discourse of Modernization: The Case of the Mizrahim", Critique, (Spring, 1997), pp. 3–18
 Ella Shohat, "Rethinking Jews and Muslims: Quincentennial Reflections", Middle East Report, No. 178 (Sep.–Oct. 1992), pp. 25–29
 Ella Shohat, "Staging the Quincentenary: The Middle East and the Americas", Third Text (London) (Special issue on "The Wake of Utopia"), 21 (Winter 1992 93), pp. 95, 105
 Ella Shohat, "Dislocated Identities: Reflections of an Arab Jew", Movement Research: Performance Journal #5 (Fall-Winter 1992), p. 8
 Ella Shohat, "Sephardim in Israel: Zionism from the Standpoint of Its Jewish Victims", Social Text, No. 19/20 (Autumn 1988), pp. 1–35
 Anat Leibler, “Disciplining Ethnicity: Social Sorting Intersects with Political Demography in Israel’s Pre-State Period,” Social Studies of Science 44, no. 2 (2014), pp. 271–92.
 Mizrahi Wanderings – Nancy Hawker on Samir Naqqash, one of Israel's foremost Arab-language Mizrahi novelists
 The Middle East's Forgotten Refugees A chronicle of Mizrahi refugees by Semha Alwaya
 The Forgotten Refugees 
 Moshe Levy The story of an Iraqi Jew in the Israeli Navy and his survival on the war-ship Eilat
 My Life in Iraq Yeheskel Kojaman describes his life as a Mizrahi Jew in Iraq in the 1950s and 1960s
 Audio interview with Ammiel Alcalay discussing Mizrahi literature
 Excerpt from The Jews of Arab Lands in Modern Times by Norman Stillman
 Etan Bloom, The Reproduction of the Model "Oriental" in the Israeli Social Space; the 50s and the speedy immigration. Tel-Aviv Univ. M.A. in the Unit for Culture Research, 2003. (Hebrew, with summary in English.)
 Orna Sasson-Levy, Avi Shoshana, "Passing" as (Non)Ethnic: The Israeli Version of Acting White. Sociological Inquiry, Vol. 83, No. 3, August 2013, pp. 448–472.
 Saul Silas Fathi Full Circle: Escape From Baghdad and the Return by Saul Silas Fathi, A prominent Iraqi Jewish family's escape from persecution.
 Road From Damascus , Tablet Magazine

Communities

 Bukharian Jews Bukharian Jewish community (English and Russian)
 PersianRabbi.com Persian Jewish community
 Kurdish Jewry (Hebrew)
 The Babylonian Jewry Heritage Center Disseminating the 3000-year-old heritage of Babylonian Jewry (English and Hebrew)
 Iraqi Jews Iraqi American Jewish Community in New York. Perpetuating the history, heritage, culture and traditions of Babylonian Jewry.
 Sha'ar Binyamin Damascus Jewry (Hebrew and Spanish)
 Jews of Lebanon
 Historical Society of Jews from Egypt
 Harissa.com Tunisian Jewish site (French)
 Jewish Djerba Djerbian Jewish site (French)
 Zlabia.com Algerian Jewish site (French)
 Dafina.net Moroccan Jewish site (French)
 The Nash Didan Community Persian Azerbaijany, Aramaic speaking community (Hebrew, some English and Aramaic)

 
Jewish ethnic groups
Ethnic groups in Israel
Jews and Judaism in Western Asia
 
Semitic-speaking peoples
Ethnic groups in the Middle East
Jewish culture